Ch'ŏnt'an station is a railway station in Ch'ŏnt'al-li, Kowŏn County, South Hamgyŏng province, North Korea, on the Kangwŏn Line of the Korean State Railway. The station, along with the rest of the Okp'yŏng–Kowŏn–Kŭmya section of the former Hamgyong Line, was opened by the Japanese on 21 July 1916.

References

Railway stations in North Korea